Worm Game was a short-lived arcade video game developed by Stadia Platform Content, used internally by employees to test features for Google Stadia prior to the launch of the cloud gaming platform until its end. The game was released to the public on January 13, 2023, five days before the service's closure, making it the only first-party developed title on the service, as well as the last game to be released on Stadia before its closure, as a thank you gift to all Stadia players.

Gameplay 
A modified version of Snake, Worm Game features a campaign mode consisting of a handful of levels in which players must move their snake to reach a golden apple, in some cases having to achieve some kind of goal in order for the apple to appear. Various fruits are scattered across each level, increasing the length of the worm when eaten. An arcade mode allows players to play unlocked levels from the campaign mode with endlessly generating fruit in order to achieve a high score on the game's leaderboard, while a multiplayer mode lets up to four people play together in either deathmatch or high score modes. Worm Game also features a stage builder, giving players the ability to create and play their own levels. Only intended to be used internally, it features rudimentary graphics and menus, and plays a single chiptune-style audio track on loop.

References 

2023 video games
Action video games
Discontinued Google services
Stadia games
Inactive online games
Lost video games
Snake video games
Multiplayer and single-player video games